Cellulomonas massiliensis is a rod-shaped bacterium from the genus Cellulomonas which has been isolated from human feces from Dielmo in Senegal.

References

 

Micrococcales
Bacteria described in 2015